Lista sumatrana is a species of moth of the family Pyralidae. It was described by E. Hering in 1901 and is known from Sumatra, Indonesia, from which its species epithet is derived.

References

Moths described in 1901
Epipaschiinae